The Garden of Mirrors is an album by Stephan Micus, released by the ECM label. It was recorded in 1995–1996 and released the following year. It follows the tradition of all of Micus's earlier works in that he plays all of the instruments: he also provides all of the voices for the 20-man chorus in three of the tracks.

Micus's inspiration for this album was two traditional low-range West African harps that he studied in Gambia: the bolombatto and the sinding. When playing these two instruments, Micus claims to have identified with early African American music, which they influenced, claiming that the bassline in jazz was influenced by these harps. Other instruments used by Micus include steel drums and four different flutes: the Japanese shakuhachi, the Balinese suling, the Irish tin whistle, and the Egyptian ney.

Track listing
"Earth"
"Passing Cloud"
"Violeta"
"Flowers in Chaos"
"In the High Valleys"
"Gates of Fire"
"Mad Bird"
"Night Circles"
"Words of Truth"

1997 albums
Stephan Micus albums
ECM Records albums